The Common Street District is a historic district in Mobile, Alabama.  It is composed of seventeen residences from 959 to 1002 Dauphin Street and 7 to 19 Common Street, primarily featuring examples of Greek Revival, Italianate, and Queen Anne style architecture.  It was added to the National Register of Historic Places on February 4, 1982.  The district was later absorbed into the much larger Old Dauphin Way Historic District.

Gallery
Examples of architecture within the Common Street District:

References

Historic districts in Mobile, Alabama
National Register of Historic Places in Mobile, Alabama
Italianate architecture in Alabama
Greek Revival architecture in Alabama
Queen Anne architecture in Alabama
Historic districts on the National Register of Historic Places in Alabama